The Worimi (also spelt Warrimay) people are Aboriginal Australians from the eastern Port Stephens and Great Lakes regions of coastal New South Wales, Australia. Before contact with settlers, their people extended from Port Stephens in the south to Forster/Tuncurry in the north and as far west as Gloucester.

Country

The Worimi's lands extended over  according to Norman Tindale, who specified that the tribal area encompassed the Hunter River to the coastal town of Forster near Cape Hawke. It reached Port Stephens and ran inland as far as roughly Gresford and in proximity of Glendon Brook, Dungog, and the upper Myall Creek. To the south, their territory extended to Maitland.

Social organization
The Worimi were divided into 4 bands.
 Garuagal. (the country adjoining Teleghery Creek and along the lower Hunter.
 Maiangal. (sea-shore south of Port Stephens, inland to Teleghery Creek.)
 Gamipingal. (northern side of Port Stephens, left bank of Karuah.)
 Buraigal. (right bank of the Karuah up to Stroud)

History of contact with British colonists
The Australian Agricultural Company was established upon an act of the British Parliament in 1824. The aim of the legislation was to further the cultivation and improvement of what it termed 'waste land' in the colony of New South Wales. In January 1826, a company agent, Robert Dawson (1782–1866), set up camp near the shoreline at Port Stephens. He confined his settlement activities to the coast, with farms on Stroud creek, outposts on the Manning River, stock-mistering in Gloucester Vale. Despite good reports, according to a modern historian, Dawson's numerous improvements, were judged inadequate and the area around Port Stephen was seen as disappointing, with useless outskirts, the central zone rocky, steep and the Gloucester flats water-logged: sheep suffered from foot-rot. The Company wanted to push beyond the hills that hemmed the settlement in, and Dawson was dismissed for mismanagement and replaced by the Arctic explorer, William Parry.

Dawson himself soon after published a vindication, and then a glowing account of the area, together with an account of the Worimi. He found the Worimi a 'mild and harmless race', and attributed any harm they might cause to the maltreatment they received from settlers, who elsewhere had been shooting them like dogs. Of the situation around Port Stephens, he wrote:
There has, perhaps, been more of this done near to this settlement, and on the banks of the two rivers which empty themselves into this harbor, than in any other part of the colony; and it has arisen from the speculators in timber..The natives complained to me frequently, that 'white pellow' (white fellows) shot their relations and friends; and showed me many orphans, whose parents had fallen by the hands of white men, near this spot. The pointed out one white man, on his coming to beg some provisions for his party up the river Karuah, who, they said, had killed ten;: and the wretch did not deny it, but said he would kill them whenever he could. It was well for him that he had no white man to depose to the facts, or I would have had him off to jail at once.'

Lifestyle
The Worimi fostered, cared for and lived on resources found within their country. Marine food, especially shell-fish were favoured by people living closest to the sea. Due to the reliability of this resource it may have been preferred over land animals and vegetables. The latter two were used as supplementary foods and added variety to their diet. Animals that were abundant included kangaroos and goannas, possums, snakes and flying foxes. Vegetables eaten included fern roots, stalks of the Gymea lily, and the bloom of the banksia.

Modern period
Today the Worimi Local Aboriginal Land Council is working closely with Worimi descendants to provide opportunities that promote, foster and protect the culture and heritage.

Alternative names

 Bahree
 Cottong
 Gadang, Kutthung, Guttahn, Kattang. (language name)
 Gingai/Gringai/Gooreenggai
 Karrapath/Carapath
 Kutthack
 Molo
 Port Stephens tribe
 Wannungine
 Warrangine (at Maitland)
 Warrimee/Warramie
 Wattung/ Watthungk

Source:

Some words
 garua,('salt-water', hence the hordal name,'Garua-gal', 'belonging to the salt water.')
 gami ('spear', hence the name Gamipingal, 'belonging to the spear')

Notes

Citations

Sources

Aboriginal peoples of New South Wales
Port Stephens Council